Kevin Charles Bartlett AM (born 6 March 1947) is a former Australian rules footballer who played for the Richmond Football Club in the Victorian Football League (VFL).

Nicknamed "KB" or "Hungry" due to his appetite for kicking goals and apparent reluctance to handpass, Bartlett is a Legend of the Australian Football Hall of Fame and is the first VFL/AFL player to have reached the 400-game milestone, a feat since achieved by four other players as of 2022; he has played the third-most number of games of any player in VFL/AFL history. He is a key member of a golden era in Richmond's history, playing in five premiership teams and winning five Jack Dyer Medals, equalling Jack Dyer's own personal tally.

Short and slender in stature, Bartlett possessed tremendous stamina, determination and a seemingly sixth sense to evade opposition players intent on negating his influence. He played much of his best football as Richmond's starting rover, but adapted superbly when moved to the half-forward flank towards the end of his career, as demonstrated in the 1980 VFL finals series.

Although his record as coach appears disappointing, he nonetheless achieved some surprise results with very limited resources. After being sacked at the end of 1991, he distanced himself from Richmond for nearly two decades.

Following his retirement as a player, Bartlett developed a successful career as a sports commentator and broadcaster on both television and radio, currently working as a match caller for 3AW. He was a member of the AFL's rules committee for many years—until he retired on 4 March 2014—as well as the selection panel for the All-Australian Team and AFL Rising Star awards.

In 2008, Bartlett was listed by journalist Mike Sheahan as the ninth-greatest player of all time in the AFL-commissioned book The Australian Game of Football.

Early years and playing career
Bartlett was born in the inner-northern Melbourne suburb of Carlton, the only son of Charles Bartlett, and grew up in Richmond. He supported  as a young boy and was a spectator at the 1954 Grand Final triumph.

As a teenager, he walked from his home in Lennox St., Richmond, to the Punt Road Oval, where he was greeted by the Richmond Fourths' coach Bill Boromeo.
It was this chance meeting that set in motion Bartlett's path towards playing for Richmond. He began his career with the under-17s side, where he won the goalkicking and the best and fairest in 1962. In 1963, he won the best and fairest in the under-19s, and Richmond made the under 19s final series. Bartlett, however, was injured seconds into the first final against Geelong, which resulted him being taken to the Prince Henry Hospital, where it was revealed that a cyst was embedded in his hip. It was while waiting for the ambulance to collect him in the MCG change rooms that he first met Jack Dyer. Dyer had appeared at the match, on the advice of Richmond under-19s coach Ray Jordon, and visited Bartlett in the rooms to tell him he will be okay. The following year for Bartlett (1964) involved rehabilitation, as he still experienced pain around his hip area.

Records and Medal
Bartlett was also the first player in elite Australian rules football to play 400 premiership games, with only six others achieving the feat as of 2022, four in the VFL/AFL (Hawthorn's Michael Tuck, North Melbourne's Brent Harvey, Essendon's Dustin Fletcher and Port Adelaide and Hawthorn's Shaun Burgoyne), one who played in the SANFL (Glenelg's Peter Carey), and one who played in both leagues (Port Adelaide and Carlton's Craig Bradley; Burgoyne also played 26 SANFL games for Port Adelaide prior to his AFL career).

His 403 premiership games remained an elite Australian rules football record until broken by Carey in Round 7 of the 1988 SANFL season, and an elite Victorian football record until broken by Tuck in Round 22 of the 1990 AFL season.

Bartlett also played 20 matches for Victoria in interstate football, and 12 pre-season night series matches (which are recognised as senior by the SANFL and WAFL but not the VFL/AFL). If these are included, Bartlett played a total of 435 career senior matches.

The Kevin Bartlett Medal is awarded each season to the player who finishes fifth in the Richmond Football Club's best and fairest count, with places one to four being the Jack Dyer, Jack Titus, Maurie Fleming, and Fred Swift Medals respectively.

Playing statistics

|-
|- style="background-color: #EAEAEA"
! scope="row" style="text-align:center" | 1965
|style="text-align:center;"|
| 29 || 14 || 13 || 15 || 183 || 21 || 204 || 17 ||  || 0.9 || 1.1 || 13.1 || 1.5 || 14.6 || 1.2 || 
|-
! scope="row" style="text-align:center" | 1966
|style="text-align:center;"|
| 29 || 14 || 19 || 17 || 222 || 9 || 231 || 23 ||  || 1.4 || 1.2 || 15.9 || 0.6 || 16.5 || 1.6 || 
|- style="background-color: #EAEAEA"
! scope="row" style="text-align:center;" | 1967
|style="text-align:center;"|
| 29 || 20 || 38 || 35 || 415 || 32 || 447 || 42 ||  || 1.9 || 1.8 || 20.8 || 1.6 || 22.4 || 2.1 || 
|-
! scope="row" style="text-align:center" | 1968
|style="text-align:center;"|
| 29 || 20 || 38 || 53 || bgcolor="CFECEC"| 481 || 32 || 513 || 48 ||  || 1.9 || 2.7 || bgcolor="DD6E81"| 24.1 || 1.6 || 25.7 || 2.4 || 
|- style="background-color: #EAEAEA"
! scope="row" style="text-align:center;" | 1969
|style="text-align:center;"|
| 29 || 22 || 30 || 43 || bgcolor="DD6E81"| 547 || 47 || bgcolor="b7e718"| 594 || 79 ||  || 1.4 || 2.0 || bgcolor="DD6E81"| 24.9 || 2.1 || 27.0 || 3.6 || 
|-
! scope="row" style="text-align:center" | 1970
|style="text-align:center;"|
| 29 || 22 || 34 || 32 || bgcolor="DD6E81"| 569 || 30 || bgcolor="DD6E81"| 599 || 79 ||  || 1.5 || 1.5 || bgcolor="DD6E81"| 25.9 || 1.4 || bgcolor="DD6E81"| 27.2 || 3.6 || 
|- style="background-color: #EAEAEA"
! scope="row" style="text-align:center" | 1971
|style="text-align:center;"|
| 29 || 24 || 53 || 46 || 512 || 41 || 553 || 59 ||  || 2.2 || 1.9 || 21.3 || 1.7 || 23.0 || 2.5 || 
|-
! scope="row" style="text-align:center" | 1972
|style="text-align:center;"|
| 29 || 21 || 34 || 35 || 441 || 21 || 462 || 48 ||  || 1.6 || 1.7 || 21.0 || 1.0 || 22.0 || 2.3 || 
|- style="background-color: #EAEAEA"
! scope="row" style="text-align:center;" | 1973
|style="text-align:center;"|
| 29 || 23 || 31 || 40 || bgcolor="b7e718"| 634 || 38 || bgcolor="b7e718"| 672 || 44 ||  || 1.3 || 1.7 || bgcolor="DD6E81"| 27.6 || 1.7 || bgcolor="DD6E81"| 29.2 || 1.9 || 
|-
! scope="row" style="text-align:center;" | 1974
|style="text-align:center;"|
| 29 || 22 || 47 || 50 || bgcolor="DD6E81"| 607 || 40 || bgcolor="DD6E81"| 647 || 48 ||  || 2.1 || 2.3 || bgcolor="DD6E81"| 27.6 || 1.8 || bgcolor="DD6E81"| 29.4 || 2.2 || 
|- style="background-color: #EAEAEA"
! scope="row" style="text-align:center" | 1975
|style="text-align:center;"|
| 29 || 23 || 42 || 50 || 465 || 70 || 535 || 37 ||  || 1.8 || 2.2 || 21.1 || 3.2 || 24.3 || 1.7 || 
|-
! scope="row" style="text-align:center" | 1976
|style="text-align:center;"|
| 29 || 22 || 27 || 31 || bgcolor="DD6E81"| 512 || 63 || 575 || 72 ||  || 1.2 || 1.4 || bgcolor="DD6E81"| 23.3 || 2.9 || 26.1 || 3.3 || 
|- style="background-color: #EAEAEA"
! scope="row" style="text-align:center" | 1977
|style="text-align:center;"|
| 29 || 23 || 55 || 33 || bgcolor="DD6E81"| 585 || 80 || bgcolor="DD6E81"| 665 || 111 ||  || 2.4 || 1.4 || bgcolor="DD6E81"| 25.4 || 3.5 || bgcolor="DD6E81"| 28.9 || 4.8 || 
|-
! scope="row" style="text-align:center" | 1978
|style="text-align:center;"|
| 29 || 22 || 44 || 39 || 474 || 70 || 544 || 83 ||  || 2.0 || 1.9 || bgcolor="b7e718"| 21.5 || 3.2 || 24.7 || 3.8 || 
|- style="background-color: #EAEAEA"
! scope="row" style="text-align:center" | 1979
|style="text-align:center;"|
| 29 || 22 || 36 || 43 || 447 || 79 || 526 || 66 ||  || 1.6 || 2.0 || 20.3 || 3.6 || 23.9 || 3.0 || 
|-
! scope="row" style="text-align:center;" | 1980
|style="text-align:center;"|
| 29 || 25 || 84 || bgcolor="DD6E81"| 67 || 415 || 59 || 474 || 61 ||  || 3.4 || bgcolor="DD6E81"| 2.7 || 16.6 || 2.4 || 19.0 || 2.4 || 
|- style="background-color: #EAEAEA"
! scope="row" style="text-align:center" | 1981
|style="text-align:center;"|
| 29 || 22 || 58 || 48 || 313 || 47 || 360 || 61 ||  || 2.6 || 2.2 || 14.2 || 2.1 || 16.4 || 2.8 || 
|-
! scope="row" style="text-align:center" | 1982
|style="text-align:center;"|
| 29 || 23 || 58 || 56 || 266 || 48 || 314 || 53 ||  || 2.5 || 2.4 || 11.6 || 2.1 || 13.7 || 2.3 || 
|- style="background-color: #EAEAEA"
! scope="row" style="text-align:center" | 1983
|style="text-align:center;"|
| 29 || 19 || 37 || 44 || 205 || 31 || 236 || 55 ||  || 1.9 || 2.3 || 10.8 || 1.6 || 12.4 || 2.9 || 
|- class="sortbottom"
! colspan=3| Career
! 403
! 778
! 777
! 8293
! 858
! 9151
! 1086
! 
! 1.9
! 1.9
! 20.6
! 2.1
! 22.8
! 2.7
! 
|}

Honours and achievements

Team
5× AFL Premiership (Richmond): 1967, 1969, 1973, 1974, 1980
3× McClelland Trophy (Richmond): 1967, 1974, 1982
Individual
Norm Smith Medal: 1980
5× Jack Dyer Medal (Richmond F.C. best and fairest): 1967, 1968, 1973, 1974, 1977
4× Michael Roach Medal (Richmond F.C. Leading Goalkicker): 1974, 1975, 1977, 1983 (tied with Michael Roach)Australian Football Media Association Player of the Year Award: 1979Victorian Representative Honours as Captain: 1980Victorian Representative HonoursRepresented "The Galahs" on the Australian Football World Tour: 1968Richmond F.C. Captain: 1979Richmond F.C. Team of the Century – RoverRichmond F.C. Hall of Fame Inductee: 2002Richmond F.C. – Best Individual Performance of the CenturyRichmond F.C. Immortal: 2004 (Conferred)Australian Football Hall of Fame Legend': 2000 Inductee

Coaching career
Bartlett was the Tigers' coach from 1988 to 1991. 
In the 1988 match against Hawthorn, after two Richmond players were felled, Bartlett was asked for a please explain by the VFL after comments he made. Controversy surrounding his dismissal as coach left him estranged from the football club for many years. However, on 30 March 2007 he attended his first official club function since 1991.

Administrative career
Kevin Bartlett was a key member and public face of the AFL "Laws of the Game" or Rules Committee until 4 March 2014. He was a selector of the Australian Football Hall of Fame from its inauguration in 1996 until his resignation in 2009, and is a selector of the yearly All-Australian team.

Media career
Bartlett joined Channel 7 in Melbourne immediately after his playing retirement, appearing regularly on World of Sport and hosting the Junior Supporters Club. In 1984, Bartlett was crowned King of Moomba. He also wrote for the Sun News Pictorial. His media commitments were put on hold during his four-year stint as Richmond coach. He has great all-round interest in most sports, and is one of the few ex-Australian football players who has carved out a career commentating on all manner of sports. From 2004, he was radio host on Melbourne's dedicated sports radio station, SEN – first with Hungry for Sport, a morning show playing on his nickname of "Hungry", and then with KB and the Doc in the afternoon with John "Dr Turf" Rothfield beginning in 2018. He also commentated Saturday and Sunday matches for SEN. He previously had hosted the breakfast program on Sport 927 until 2003. He commentated on cable-TV for Fox Footy and was the host of the popular nostalgia show Grumpy Old Men on Fox Footy until the channel's closure at the end of the 2006 season. He also did a Richmond-centric official alternate commentary for FOX's broadcast of Richmond vs. North Melbourne in June 2014 called "Press Red for Kev" in response to the "Press Red for Ed" Collingwood-centric alternate commentaries led by Eddie McGuire.

On 13 September 2008, he appeared in a Toyota Memorable Moments advertisement. The advertisement includes Bartlett recreating his seven goals from the 1980 VFL Grand Final, as well as his famous 'comb-over' hair style, which comedian Dave Lawson recreates by shaving his own hair on camera. Geelong's Matthew Scarlett impersonated the haircut, at his 'Mad Monday' celebrations after the 2008 Grand Final.

Bartlett and fellow Richmond legend Matthew Richardson were also featured on an official 2018 recording of We're From Tigerland.
In 2019, Bartlett departed SEN following a dispute with management. Following this he joined the 3AW football call team as a Sunday caller.

Return
Bartlett's refusal to return to any Richmond Football Club function, or an official club arrangement lasted from the end of 1991 until 2007. In 2007, he attended a Tommy Hafey Club Function – in support of his lifelong friend Tom Hafey and on 22 November 2007, walked into the Punt Road ground (Richmond's home ground) to launch the centenary publication Richmond F.C: A Century of League Football'', which was written by his son Rhett. It was the first time KB had set foot into Punt Road since his sacking at the end of 1991.

Recognition
Bartlett was made a Member of the Order of Australia in 1981, and was inducted into the Australian Football Hall of Fame and Richmond Hall of Fame in 1996 and 2002, respectively; he was promoted to "legend" status in the Australian Football Hall of Fame in 2000 and to "immortal" status in the Richmond Hall of Fame in 2004. He was also named as part of Richmond's team of the century. He was inducted into the Sport Australia Hall of Fame in 2006. On 22 March 2017, a statue of Bartlett was unveiled outside the Melbourne Cricket Ground.

Personal life
Bartlett married Denise Kilcullen, who was a talented runner as a youth, at St Paul's Anglican Church in Ascot Vale on 28 November 1970. They have four children: three daughters – Sharna, Cara and Breanna – and one son, Rhett. All three of the Bartlett daughters starred in track and field during their school days. Rhett is a writer, broadcaster, and historian of the Richmond Football Club, having released books about both his father and the club's history, as well as curating the "Tigerland Archive" website.

References

Bibliography
1971 Tiger Year Book – Richmond Football Club

External links

 

AFL Hall of Fame – Legends

1947 births
Living people
Richmond Football Club players
Richmond Football Club Premiership players
Richmond Football Club coaches
Australian Football Hall of Fame inductees
Australian rules football commentators
Norm Smith Medal winners
Victorian State of Origin players
Members of the Order of Australia
Jack Dyer Medal winners
Australian rules footballers from Melbourne
Sport Australia Hall of Fame inductees
Radio personalities from Melbourne
Five-time VFL/AFL Premiership players
People from Richmond, Victoria